CBSP can refer to:
Centralne Biuro Śledcze Policji
Committee for Charity and Support for the Palestinians